Mülheim is a borough (Stadtbezirk) of Cologne in Germany and a formerly independent town (Mülheim am Rhein). Mülheim is located on the right bank of the Rhine opposite the old town of Cologne. 
 
The district borders Leverkusen to the north, Bergisch Gladbach to the east, the Cologne districts of Kalk and Innenstadt to the south. The river Rhine lies west of Mülheim, on the other riverbank lies the Cologne borough of Nippes.

The district is ethnically diverse, with a significant Turkish population.

History 
The place was first mentioned (as Mulenheym) in 1098 and became a town in 1322; it belonged to the County of Berg. In April 1914, Mülheim was incorporated into Cologne.

Subdivisions 
Mülheim consists of nine Stadtteile (city parts):

Transportation 

Mülheim is served by numerous railway stations and highway. Train stations include Köln-Mülheim, Köln-Buchforst, Köln-Dellbrück and Köln-Stammheim, as well as numerous light rail stations of Cologne Stadtbahn line 3, 4, 13 and 18. Bundesautobahn 3 passes through Dellbrück and Dünnwald, as part of the Cologne Beltway.

Rhine bridges 
  Mülheimer Brücke

Notable people 

 Adam Adami, Roman Catholic diplomat and priest (1610–1663)
 Abraham Roentgen, cabinet maker (1711–1793)
 Herbert Eulenberg, poet and author (1876–1949)
 Catharina Josepha Pratten, guitarist and composer (1821–1895)
 Johann Bendel, rector and historian (1863–1947)
 Peter Kürten, serial killer (1883–1931)
 Willi Ostermann, singer and poet (1876–1936)
 Adolf Rodewyk, Jesuit and exorcist (1894–1989)
 Rainer Woelki, Archbishop of Cologne (*1956)

References

External links 

 Official webpage of the district 

 
Boroughs and quarters of Cologne
1098 establishments in Europe